The 2000 South Florida Bulls football team represented the University of South Florida (USF) in the 2000 NCAA Division I-AA football season, and was the fourth team fielded by the school. The Bulls were led by head coach Jim Leavitt in his fourth year, played their home games at Raymond James Stadium in Tampa, Florida and competed as a Division I-AA Independent. The Bulls finished the season with a record of seven wins and four losses (7–4).

Schedule

Roster

References

South Florida
South Florida Bulls football seasons
South Florida Bulls football